Jim Grabb (born April 14, 1964) is an American former professional tennis player. In doubles, he won the 1989 French Open and the 1992 US Open. He was ranked the world No. 1 doubles player in both 1989 and 1993. His best singles ranking of world No. 24, he achieved in 1990.

Tennis career

Early years
Grabb is Jewish, and he attended Tucson High Magnet School. Grabb was from 1984 to 1986 a three-time doubles and two-time singles all-American, helping Stanford University win the NCAA title in 1986 and finish runner-up in 1984.

In 1986, he won the annual Rafael Osuna Award, presented by college coaches for good sportsmanship and valuable contributions to the sport.

Professional career
Grabb defeated Andre Agassi at a singles tournament in Seoul, Korea in 1987 for his first career victory. He won two doubles Grand Slam events: the 1989 French Open (with Patrick McEnroe) and the 1992 US Open (with Richey Reneberg). He won 23 doubles tour titles, with 26 finals appearances. He won two tour singles titles, in 1987 at Seoul and in 1992 at Taipei. His best showing in a Grand Slam event was fourth-round appearance in the 1989 US Open.

Grabb won the men's 35 senior doubles with his tennis partner Richey Reneberg at the 2002 and 2003 US Open.

Davis Cup
He was a member of the United States Davis Cup team in 1993.

Hall of Fame
The Northern California section of the USTA inducted Grabb into its Hall of Fame in 2006.

Grand Slam finals

Doubles (2 titles, 1 runner-up)

Career finals

Doubles (23–27)

Grand Prix and ATP Tour finals

Singles (2 wins, 1 loss)

Doubles performance timeline

Miscellaneous
Grabb was ranked 17th on Sports Illustrated's list of  Arizona's 50 Greatest Sports Figures of the 20th century. He served as vice president of the ATP Tour Player Council in 1998–99.

Grabb married Sarah Stenn in 2002 in California.  While on tour he resided, at least for a time, in Hermosa Beach, California.

See also

List of select Jewish tennis players

References

External links
 
 
 
 NWHC bio

1964 births
Living people
American male tennis players
French Open champions
Jewish American sportspeople
Jewish tennis players
People from Hermosa Beach, California
Sportspeople from Tucson, Arizona
Stanford Cardinal men's tennis players
Tennis people from Arizona
Tennis people from California
US Open (tennis) champions
Grand Slam (tennis) champions in men's doubles
International Jewish Sports Hall of Fame inductees
Tucson High School alumni
21st-century American Jews
ATP number 1 ranked doubles tennis players